Phiona Nyamutooro is a Ugandan politician and legislator representing the Youth in the parliament of Uganda, she is the National female youth Member of parliament in the parliament of Uganda. She is a member of the National Resistance Movement (NRM) on whose ticket she got to parliament.

Background and education 
Nyamutoro holds a first class degree in development studies and a master's degree in public administration from Makerere university. She went to Najjera progressives for her primary school education,  Pallisa Secondary school for O'level and Bweyogerere Secondary school for A'level.

Career 
Nyamutoro was a vice guild president while Makerere University 2015  -2016.

She was also a member of the National Youth council representing Nebbi district. Nyamutoro is the first National youth Member of Parliament hailing from Nebbi district.

Nyamutoro is also a champion of anti pregnancy and Gender issues.

In parliament, she is a member of the committee on education and sports.

References 

Women members of the Parliament of Uganda
Members of the Parliament of Uganda
21st-century Ugandan women politicians
21st-century Ugandan politicians
National Resistance Movement politicians

Year of birth missing (living people)
Living people